The California Code of Regulations (CCR, Cal. Code Regs.) is the codification of the general and permanent rules and regulations (sometimes called administrative law) announced in the California Regulatory Notice Register by California state agencies under authority from primary legislation in the California Codes. Such rules and regulations are reviewed, approved, and made available to the public by the Office of Administrative Law (OAL), and are also filed with the Secretary of State.

The CCR consists of 28 titles and contains the regulations of approximately 200 regulatory agencies. Title 24, the California Building Standards Code, is not maintained by the OAL but by the California Building Standards Commission. It has been alleged that the regulations have substantial portions under copyright (e.g., Title 24, the California Building Standards Code), but Title 24, California Code of Regulations, though administered and authored by the Building Standards Commission of the State of California, including the building, residential, electrical, mechanical, plumbing, energy, historical building, fire, existing building, green building, and referenced standards codes applicable in the state of California along with the standards incorporated by reference into these codes, is considered to be in the public domain. In Veeck v. SBCCI, the 5th Circuit of the United States Court of Appeals ruled:

The regulations have the force of California law. Some regulations, such as the California Department of Social Services Manual of Policies and Procedures concerning welfare in California, are separately published (i.e., "available for public use in the office of the welfare department of each county").

Its role is similar to the Code of Federal Regulations. Unlike the Federal Register, California regulations are not normally published in the Notice Register, meaning that until they are codified in the CCR they must be obtained from the individual agencies or elsewhere.

History 

The CCR's predecessor, the California Administrative Code (CAC), resulted from efforts that began in 1941 to codify the growing body of state regulations.  In 1988, the Legislature renamed the CAC to the CCR to reduce confusion with the enacted statutory codes.

The OAL contracts with Barclays, a division of Thomson Reuters, to provide a free online version of the official CCR, which is currently provided on the Web through a Westlaw-based interface. In 2008, Carl Malamud published title 24 of the CCR, the California Building Standards Code, on Public.Resource.Org for free, even though the OAL claims publishing regulations with the force of law without relevant permissions is unlawful. In March 2012, Malamud published the rest of the CCR on law.resource.org.

In February 2013 California State Assemblyman Brian Nestande (R-42) introduced AB 292 that would mandate the CCR be published under a Creative Commons license.

Procedure 

Regulations are reviewed, approved, and made available to the public by the California Office of Administrative Law (OAL) pursuant to the California Administrative Procedure Act (APA). The California Regulatory Notice Register contains notices of proposed regulatory actions by state regulatory agencies to adopt, amend, or repeal regulations contained in the CCR. A state agency must complete its rulemaking and submit the rulemaking file to OAL within one year of the date of publication of a Notice of Proposed Action in the Notice Register. The OAL publishes the Notice Register every Friday.

List of regulation titles 

 Title 1: General Provisions
 Title 2: Administration
 Title 3: Food and Agriculture
 Title 4: Business Regulations
 Title 5: Education
 Title 6: Governor's Regulations (empty)
 Title 7: Harbors and Navigation
 Title 8: Industrial Regulations
 Title 9: Rehabilitative and Developmental Services
 Title 10: Investment
 Title 11: Law
 Title 12: Military and Veterans
 Title 13: Motor Vehicles
 Title 14: Natural Resources
 Title 15: Crime Prevention and Corrections
 Title 16: Professional and Vocational Regulations
 Title 17: Public Health
 Title 18: Public Revenues
 Title 19: Public Safety
 Title 20: Public Utilities and Energy
 Title 21: Public Works
 Title 22: Social Security
 Title 23: Waters
 Title 24: California Building Standards Code
 Title 25: Housing and Community Development
 Title 26: Toxics
 Title 27: Environmental Protection
 Title 28: Managed Health Care

See also 
 California Regulatory Notice Register
 Law of California
 Code of Federal Regulations

References

External links 
 
 California Code of Regulations from Westlaw
 California Code of Regulations from Public.Resource.Org
  California Code of Regulations from Google Code

California administrative law
California
Publications of the Government of California
Government databases in the United States
Online law databases